Douglas Leonard Buhr (June 29, 1949 in Vancouver, British Columbia – October 13, 2006) was a Canadian ice hockey player. A left wing, he played 6 games in the National Hockey League for the Kansas City Scouts during the 1974–75 season. The rest of his career, which lasted from 1972 to 1978, was spent in the minor leagues, and he finished with several years of senior hockey.

Career statistics

Regular season and playoffs

External links
 

1949 births
2006 deaths
Canadian ice hockey left wingers
Kansas City Scouts players
Oklahoma City Blazers (1965–1977) players
Portland Buckaroos players
Ice hockey people from Vancouver
Springfield Indians players
Springfield Kings players
Undrafted National Hockey League players
University of British Columbia alumni
Victoria Cougars (BCJHL) players